Raúl Guzmán may refer to:
 Raúl Guzmán (swimmer)
 Raúl Guzmán (racing driver)